Michael Jackson Sr. (born January 10, 1997) is an American football cornerback for the Seattle Seahawks of the National Football League (NFL). He played college football at Miami (FL) and was drafted by the Dallas Cowboys in the fifth round of the 2019 NFL Draft.

Early years 
Jackson attended Spain Park High School. In the summer before his senior season, Jackson said that he wanted to go out of his home state of Alabama to play college football. During his senior season in 2014, he was named co-Alabama High School Player of the Week in mid-October after preserving a 14-13 win over Vestavia Hills High School by blocking an extra point and field goal in the fourth quarter.

Jackson committed to University of Miami in late October 2014 after visiting the campus the previous June, choosing the school over Minnesota, Georgia, LSU and Nebraska. He was rated as a three-star recruit by 247Sports.com.

College career 
As a freshman, he played mainly on special teams. As a sophomore, he was a backup, tallying 7 tackles (2 solo), one pass breakup and one fumble recovery.

As a junior, he appeared in all 13 games with 10 starts. He collected 43 tackles, 4 interceptions (tied for the team lead) and 5 pass breakups.
He was on a roll in October, intercepting a pass against Florida State University and two more two weeks later against Syracuse University.

On January 5, 2018, Jackson announced on his Twitter account that he would return to the Hurricanes for his senior season. He was projected in some publications to go in the first round of the 2019 NFL Draft. As a senior, he started all 13 games, posting 42 tackles (3.5 tackles for loss), 2.5 sacks and 6 pass breakups (second on the team). After his senior season, Jackson was named honorable mention all-ACC.

Professional career

Dallas Cowboys
Jackson was selected by the Dallas Cowboys in the fifth round (158th overall) of the 2019 NFL Draft. He was waived on August 31 and signed to the practice squad on September 2.

Detroit Lions
On October 30, 2019, Jackson was signed by the Detroit Lions off the Cowboys practice squad. He appeared in one game and was declared inactive in eight contests. He played only two special teams snaps in the eleventh game against the Washington Redskins and did not post any statistics.

New England Patriots
On August 9, 2020, the Lions announced that they had waived Jackson. However later that day, he was traded to the New England Patriots for a conditional 2022 seventh-round draft pick. He was waived on September 3, 2020. He was re-signed to the practice squad on September 28. He was promoted to the active roster on January 2, 2021. He played in the season finale against the New York Jets and had one tackle. He was waived on August 31, 2021.

Seattle Seahawks
On September 2, 2021, Jackson was signed to the Seattle Seahawks practice squad. He signed a reserve/future contract with the Seahawks on January 10, 2022.

Personal life 
Jackson's son, Michael Jackson Jr., was born in April 2018.

References

External links 
Miami Hurricanes Bio

1997 births
Living people
Players of American football from Birmingham, Alabama
American football cornerbacks
Miami Hurricanes football players
Dallas Cowboys players
Detroit Lions players
New England Patriots players
Seattle Seahawks players